Anatoliy Pavlovych Piskovets (born 27 March 1948) is a Ukrainian professional football coach and a former midfielder.

From 1996 to 1998 and again from 2000 to 2002, he served as head coach of the Ukraine women's national football team.

References

External links

 
 

1948 births
Living people
Footballers from Kyiv
Ukrainian footballers
FC Elista players
FC Frunzenets-Liha-99 Sumy players
Ukrainian football managers
Ukrainian expatriate football managers
Expatriate football managers in the United Arab Emirates
Expatriate football managers in Russia
Expatriate football managers in Azerbaijan
Expatriate football managers in Armenia
Expatriate football managers in Georgia (country)
Expatriate football managers in Poland
Expatriate football managers in Latvia
FC Nyva Myronivka managers
FC Kryvbas Kryvyi Rih managers
Ukrainian Premier League managers
WFC Alina Kyiv managers
FC Metalurgi Rustavi managers
FC Volyn Lutsk managers
WFC Lehenda-ShVSM Chernihiv managers
Ukraine women's national football team managers
Association football midfielders
Ukrainian expatriate sportspeople in the United Arab Emirates
Ukrainian expatriate sportspeople in Armenia
Ukrainian expatriate sportspeople in Georgia (country)
Ukrainian expatriate sportspeople in Poland
Ukrainian expatriate sportspeople in Latvia
Ukrainian expatriate sportspeople in Azerbaijan